The Northeast Iowa Council is a council of the Boy Scouts of America that serves all Boy Scouts, Cub Scouts, adult volunteers and Venturers in Northeast Iowa.

History
In 1915 the Dubuque Council (#178) was formed, changing its name to the Dubuque Area Council (#178) in 1934. The council changed its name to the Northeast Iowa Council (#178) in 1935.

In 1918 the Clinton Council (#174) was formed, changing its name to the Clinton Area Council (#174) in 1927. The Clinton Area Council changed its name to the Macquarie Area Council (#174) in 1937.

Organization
The council is broken up geographically into districts:
Delaykee
Dubuque
Theoretically there is also a third district for Exploring.

Camps
Camp C.S. Klaus is situated within a wooded valley approximately  NW of Colesburg, Iowa.

Camp C.S. Klaus has a large grass parade grounds area where the Lyon's Camp Office is located. This area has proven itself as a great location for activities and games.  The parade grounds also provides a place for Scout troops to camp during the off-season.

Geography
The waterfalls within the camp are the source of Brownfield Creek, a trout stream that flows into a man made  lake known as Lake John Deere.  Many of the aquatics programs (canoeing, sailing, swimming, snorkeling, kayaking) offered at summer camp take place here. The lake is also known to have fish.  Fishing for bassets, greengill and sour krout is quite common.

The newest addition to the camp is the backyard also known as the valley. Purchased with donations from over 120 individuals and local businesses, this land was dedicated in 2006. The Backyard abuts the NE corner of the main camp. This  piece of land is home to many new programs. This area is also home to the ice cave that Scouts have been visiting for decades. This area is often utilized for wilderness survival, leave-no-trace camping, hiking, nature study, star-gazing, viewing wildlife and a competition level Navigation Course for teaching orienteering with a map and compass and GPS navigation.

Improvements
Over the last 15 years, Camp C.S. Klaus has seen a tremendous number of improvement projects and additional facilities including, new building construction, building renovation, program upgrades and camp infrastructure upgrades. These improvements have come from many extremely dedicated volunteers that have donated much of their time, resources and skills.  Despite these renovations the camp is still quite rustic.

Order of the Arrow

The Order of the Arrow Scouting's national honor society is represented in the Northeast Iowa Council by the Timmeu Lodge.  The Timmeu Lodge is part of Section G8, in the Gateway Region.

See also
Scouting in Iowa

References

External links
Central Region Venturing
Scout Shop
Section G8 - Order of the Arrow

Local councils of the Boy Scouts of America
Central Region (Boy Scouts of America)
Youth organizations based in Iowa